Aminophosphonates are organophosphorus compounds with the formula (RO)2P(O)CR'2NR"2.  These compounds are structural analogues of amino acids in which a carboxylic moiety is replaced by phosphonic acid or related groups. Acting as antagonists of amino acids, they inhibit enzymes involved in amino acid metabolism and thus affect the physiological activity of the cell. These effects may be exerted as antibacterial, plant growth regulatory or neuromodulatory. They can act as ligands, and heavy metal complexes with aminophosphonates have had medical applications investigated.

Phosphonates are more difficult to hydrolyse than phosphates.

Preparation
Aminophosphonates are often prepared by hydrophosphonylation, usually the condensation of imines and phosphorous acid. In the Pudovik reaction or Kabachnik–Fields reaction the esters of phosphorous acid are employed, e.g. diphenylphosphite. Because these compounds are of pharmaceutical interest, methods have been developed to induce these additions asymmetrically.

Examples

References

Amino acids
Phosphonic acids